Ceriagrion suave is a species of damselfly in the family Coenagrionidae. It is found in Angola, Botswana, Burkina Faso, Ivory Coast, Ethiopia, Gambia, Ghana, Guinea, Kenya, Liberia, Malawi, Mozambique, Namibia, Nigeria, Senegal, Sierra Leone, Somalia, South Africa, Tanzania, Togo, Uganda, Zambia, Zimbabwe, and possibly Burundi.

Habitat
Its natural habitats are pools and streams in subtropical or tropical dry savanna, moist savanna, dry shrubland and moist shrubland.

References

Coenagrionidae
Insects described in 1921
Taxonomy articles created by Polbot